Mecynognathus damelii is a species of beetle in the family Carabidae, the only species in the genus Mecynognathus.

References

Pterostichinae